Matthew A. Brady was a district attorney in San Francisco from 1919 through 1943.

Brady defeated previous district attorney Charles Fickert, who was responsible for the conviction of Tom Mooney and Warren Billings in the Preparedness Day bombing. By 1926, he was convinced that Mooney and Billings were unjustly convicted. In a letter to Governor Friend W. Richardson, Brady wrote "If these matters that have developed during the trials could be called to the attention of a court that had jurisdiction to grant a new trial, undoubtedly a new trial would be granted. Furthermore, if a new trial were granted, there would be no possibility of convicting Mooney or Billings." In 1935, he empaneled a grand jury and hired private investigator Edwin Atherton to report on police corruption in the San Francisco Police Department.

Brady presided over numerous high-profile cases in the 1920s and 1930s, including the three Fatty Arbuckle murder trials, and the arrest and roundup of Communists.

In 1936, Brady was D.A. during the infamous sterilization plot charged by Ann Cooper Hewitt, 21-year-old heiress, and daughter of Peter Cooper Hewitt, against her mother, Marion Jeanne Andrews, accused of sterilizing her daughter, Ann, to thwart an inheritance dependent on the young woman having children, in a climate of California Eugenics law, and aided by Dr. Tilton E Tillman and Samuel G. Boyd.

He was defeated for reelection by Pat Brown in 1943, which was the second time the two had competed for the office.

References

External links
 Brady statement on 1934 roundup

History of San Francisco
District attorneys in California
Lawyers from San Francisco
Year of birth missing
Year of death missing
20th-century American lawyers
American anti-communists